Parliamentary elections were held in Slovakia on 17 June 2006. Direction – Social Democracy emerged as the largest party in the National Council, winning 50 of the 150 seats. Its leader Robert Fico was appointed Prime Minister on 4 July 2006, leading a three-party centre-left populist coalition.

Background
Originally the election was planned for 16 September 2006. However, on 8 February the government proposed calling an early election after the Christian Democratic Movement left the coalition government. This proposal was passed by the Parliament on 9 February and signed by the President on 13 February. For the first time Slovak citizens living abroad could vote, using absentee ballots. A total of 21 parties contested the elections.

Results

Results by region

Aftermath
On 28 June Fico announced that the government coalition would consist of his Smer-SD, together with the SNS and ĽS-HZDS. The Party of European Socialists (PES) criticized this decision because of nationalist statements of the leader of the SNS and subsequently suspended Smer-SD's membership.

References

External links
Official results
Slovak Election Data Project
Electoral Geography
BBC coverage of election results

Slovakia
Parliamentary elections in Slovakia
Parliamentary election
June 2006 events in Europe